The Finnish Business People's Union (SLL) was a trade union representing clerical workers in Finland.

The union was founded in 1906, and in 1944 it became a founding affiliate of the Confederation of Salaried Employees.  By 1986, it had 18.446 members.

In 1987, the union merged with the Commercial Workers' Union, and the Trade and Industry Officials' Union, to form the Business Union.

References

Clerical trade unions
Trade unions established in 1906
Trade unions disestablished in 1987
Trade unions in Finland
1906 establishments in Finland